One Police Plaza is a 1986 Canadian-American television film directed by Jerry Jameson. The musical score was composed by Mark Snow. The film starring Robert Conrad, George Dzundza, James Olson, Jamey Sheridan, Larry Riley, Lisa Banes and Joe Grifasi in the lead roles.

Cast
 Robert Conrad as Lieutenant Daniel B. Malone
 George Dzundza as Detective Gustav Stamm
 James Olson as Whitney Zangline
 Jamey Sheridan as Detective Bo Davis
 Larry Riley as Detective Starling
 Lisa Banes as Erica
 Joe Grifasi as Inspector Nicholas Zambrano
 Stephen Joyce as Chief Dennie McQuade
 Earl Hindman as Detective Jake Stern
 Anthony Zerbe as Yakov Anderman
 Janet-Laine Green as Janet Fox
 Peter MacNeill as David Ancorie
 Barton Heyman as Judge Niarxos
 Nicholas Hormann as Morris Dunbar

References

External links
 

English-language Canadian films
1986 films
1980s crime thriller films
Films shot in Montreal
Canadian crime thriller films
Films directed by Jerry Jameson
1980s English-language films
1980s Canadian films